L'Ordure à l'état Pur (French for The pure essence of Garbage) is the fourth full-length studio album by the French black metal band Peste Noire. It was released in 2013 on the Compact Disc format under bandleader Ludovic "Famine" Faure's own record label: La Mesnie Herlequin, which he established that same year.

Style
Although fundamentally a black metal album at its core, L'Ordure à l'état Pur exhibits prominent French folk music, avant-garde, and industrial elements mixed in with traces of ska punk, post-metal, and electronia.

In addition to the name of the album itself, its song titles and lyrics are entirely written/sung in the French language – maintaining a consistency with the band's other releases.

Track listing

Personnel

Peste Noire

DJ Famine (Ludovic Faure) – Harsh vocals, acoustic guitar, lead guitar, rhythm guitar, Epinette des Vosges
Vicomte Chtedire de Kroumpadis – Drums, percussion
Audrey Sylvain – Clean vocals

Session musicians

Indria – bass guitar, fretless bass
Lulu l'ermite – Backing vocals (on "J’avais rêvé du Nord" and "Sale Famine von Valfoutre")
Engwar – Engineering, mixing, cello, timpani and backing vocals (on "La condi hu")
Miss Peste Nègre – Accordion
Rachid de France – Trombone
Seigneur Arawn – Additional vocals (on "J’avais rêvé du Nord")
L'Atrabilaire Maldo – Occitan preaches (on "Casse, Pêches, Fractures et Traditions")

Additional personnel
 Mika Jussila – Mastering
 Valnègre (Jean-Emmanuel Simoulin) – Artwork and photography

References

Peste Noire albums
2011 albums